Michael John Wheble MBE (born 1949) is a retired Racing Manager, marketing executive, author and charity advocate.

Career
He held the senior role, that of a Greyhound Board of Great Britain licensed Racing Manager at Leicester Stadium and Coventry Stadium before taking the position of Racing Manager at Oxford Stadium in the mid-eighties.

He was instrumental in securing a first Bookmakers Afternoon Greyhound Service (BAGS) contract for Oxford and Ramsgate Stadium and then steered the company as the Group Racing Manager.
 
In 2005 he was awarded the Order of the British Empire (MBE) in the 2005 Birthday Honours for services to Greyhound Racing and to Charity.
Wheble wrote the children's stories 'The Adventures of Gordon the Greyhound' and the 'Further Adventures of Gordon the Greyhound' and is a keen advocate of the Retired Greyhound Trust and has been a regular guest presenter on BBC Radio.

References

Living people
People in greyhound racing
Members of the Order of the British Empire
1949 births